is a successful 1773 drama by Johann Wolfgang von Goethe, based on the memoirs of the historical adventurer-poet Gottfried or Götz von Berlichingen. It first appeared in English in 1799 as Goetz of Berlichingen of the Iron Hand in a rather free version by Walter Scott.

Goethe's plot treats events freely: while the historical Götz died in his eighties, Goethe's hero is a free spirit, a maverick, intended to be a pillar of national integrity against a deceitful and over-refined society, and the way in which he tragically succumbs to the abstract concepts of law and justice shows the submission of the individual in that society.

 was one of Goethe's early successes but its large cast size, frequent quick scene changes, and long running time caused the original version to eventually fall out of favour. The play has been re-arranged and cut many times, including two versions by Goethe that were published posthumously.  A 1925 silent film Goetz von Berlichingen of the Iron Hand was directed by Hubert Moest, while a 1955 Austrian production Goetz von Berlichingen starred Ewald Balser in the title role. In 1979 Wolfgang Liebeneiner directed Raimund Harmstorf in a film version, Goetz von Berlichingen of the Iron Hand.

Famous quote

The first version of the drama included a quote that gained fame fast. In the third act, Götz is under siege by the Imperial Army in his castle at Jagsthausen. The captain of the army asked him to surrender; from a window, he gives his answer:

It can be translated as:

Goethe based this passage on the autobiography of the historical Götz, who records himself as saying (in a different context) "" ("He can lick me on the behind").

The "he can lick me in the arse" quote became known euphemistically as the Swabian salute or the Götz quote. Only the editions of 1773 and 1774 had the full quote. After that, it was long common practice in printed editions to truncate the quote to " — — — ".

Mozart in 1782 wrote a canon inspired by it, "". Mozart or Wenzel Trnka wrote the canon "".

References

External links
 

Plays by Johann Wolfgang von Goethe
Plays set in Germany
1773 plays